Amanda Brown (born 2 May 1965) is a former professional British tennis player who reached the second round of Wimbledon (on two occasions) and the Australian Open, as well as competing for Great Britain at the 1984 Olympics and the 1984 Federation Cup. As a junior, she twice won the junior title at the Australian Open, in 1982 and 1983. She played her first matches on the WTA tour in November 1982 and her final matches at Wimbledon in 1986. During her career, Brown successfully gained victories over players such as Sue Barker, Sara Gomer, Annabel Croft and Gigi Fernández.

Brown also reached the doubles final at the tournament in Salt Lake City in 1983, the singles semifinals in Hershey (as a qualifier) and Denver in 1984, and the singles quarterfinals in Melbourne in 1985.

Performance timelines

Singles

Doubles

Mixed doubles

Fed Cup

References

External links
 
 
 
 
 

1965 births
Living people
British female tennis players
Grand Slam (tennis) champions in girls' singles
Australian Open (tennis) junior champions
Olympic tennis players of Great Britain
Tennis players at the 1984 Summer Olympics
Place of birth missing (living people)